Changqing National Nature Reserve is located near Huayang Village  in the Qin Mountains of Shaanxi province of China.

 Area: 
 Highest point: 
 Year established: 1995

Flora and fauna
Crested ibis, Nipponia nippon 
 Giant panda, Ailuropoda melanoleuca 
 Golden monkey, Rhinopithecus roxellanae 
 Golden takin, Budorcas taxicolor bedfordi 
 31 species of threatened plants
Research has shown that this reserve used to be the largest panda habitat in the world.

References

External links
 cqpanda
 Interview with conservationist working there

Geography of Shaanxi
Nature reserves in China